Eukaryotic translation initiation factor 4E family member 3 is a protein that in humans is encoded by the EIF4E3 gene.

EIF4E3 belongs to the EIF4E family of translational initiation factors that interact with the 5-prime cap structure of mRNA and recruit mRNA to the ribosome.

Model organisms

Model organisms have been used in the study of EIF4E3 function. A conditional knockout mouse line, called Eif4e3tm1a(KOMP)Wtsi was generated as part of the International Knockout Mouse Consortium program — a high-throughput mutagenesis project to generate and distribute animal models of disease to interested scientists — at the Wellcome Trust Sanger Institute.

Male and female animals underwent a standardized phenotypic screen to determine the effects of deletion. Twenty four tests were carried out on mutant mice but no significant abnormalities were observed.

References
 

Genes mutated in mice

External links